WVHL is a Country formatted broadcast radio station licensed to Farmville, Virginia, serving the Southside.  WVHL is owned and operated by North Street Enterprise, Inc.

Additionally, WVHL is the primary radio broadcaster for basketball, baseball, and softball for Longwood University.

References

External links
 Kickin' Country 92.9 Online
 

VHL
Country radio stations in the United States
Radio stations established in 1996